Germignaga is a comune (municipality) in the Province of Varese in the Italian region Lombardy, located about 70 km northwest of Milan and about 20 km northwest of Varese. As of 31 December 2004, it had a population of 3,721 and an area of 6.2 km².

The municipality of Germignaga contains the frazioni (subdivisions, mainly villages and hamlets) Ronchetto, Ronchi, Fornace, Casa Moro, Premaggio and Mirandola Nuova.

Germignaga borders the following municipalities: Brezzo di Bedero, Brissago-Valtravaglia, Cannero Riviera, Luino, Montegrino Valtravaglia.

Demographic evolution

Noted Germignaga people 
 Pier Giacomo Pisoni, historian

References

External links
 www.comune.germignaga.va.it/

Cities and towns in Lombardy